Saldoida slossonae is a species of shore bug in the family Saldidae. It is found in North America.

Subspecies
These two subspecies belong to the species Saldoida slossonae:
 Saldoida slossonae slossonae Osborn, 1901
 Saldoida slossonae wileyae Hungerford, 1922

References

Articles created by Qbugbot
Insects described in 1901
Saldoidini